Pakri Landscape Conservation Area is a nature park which is located in Harju County, Estonia.

The area of the nature park is 3164 ha.

The protected area was founded in 1998 to protect landscapes and biodiversity of Pakri Islands.

References

Nature reserves in Estonia
Geography of Harju County